Camille Remy Alexandre Gardelle (Montauban, 31 July 1866 - 1947) was a French architect.

Gardelle graduated from the École des Beaux-Arts. An exponent of Eclecticism, he built a notable work in Montevideo, Uruguay:
Palacio Pietracaprina, 1913, currently the Embassy of Brazil
refurbishing of Castillo Soneira, 1914 (original by Víctor Rabú)
Palacio Piria, originally a residence for Francisco Piria, nowadays headquarters of the Supreme Court of Uruguay
Palacio Jackson, later known as Palacio Brasil
Electoral Court

Literature

References

1866 births
1947 deaths
People from Montauban
École des Beaux-Arts alumni
20th-century French architects
Uruguayan architects